Osman Pamukoğlu (born December 27, 1947) is a retired major general of the Turkish Army, author and politician who founded the Rights and Equality Party on September 4, 2008 in remembrance of the Congress of Sivas. 

He holds the title of being the only general in the Turkish Army honored with five medals of "Establishment of Superior Troops". He also received two medals of High Courage and Sacrifice and other less significant awards during his service. He also holds the title of being the only general who fought amongst his soldiers, after Mustafa Kemal Atatürk.  

On July 28, 2008, he declared a statement on his personal website about the state of the circumstance in which Turkey was, and guiding principles and promised actions of the party. HEPAR was established within the following period of 36 days. His party is distinct from the remaining political parties of Turkey as it is the only political movement that is sponsored by the donations of the public, his supporters and predominantly his readers.

Books by Osman Pamukoğlu
 Unutulanlar Dışında Yeni Bir Şey Yok (2003)
 Ey Vatan Arkadaşlar Uykulardan Uyansın (2004)
 Kara Tohum (2005)
 Ayandon (2005)
 Yolcu/Beyhude Geçmesin Bu Ömür (2006)
 İnsan ve Devlet (2007)
 Angut (2008)
 Korkunun Çocukları (2010)
 Akıllı Ol! (2012)
 Siyasetin Sefaleti (2013)
 Cehennemdere Kanyonu (2013)

References
http://www.hakveesitlik.org.tr/osman_pamukoglu_biyografi/
http://www.bilgicik.com/yazi/osman-pamukoglu-biyografi-hayati-kim-kimdir/

External links 
 HEPAR
 Osman Pamukoğlu İzlenceleri
 Sayın, Osman Pamukoğlu ile ilgili haberler

1947 births
People from Sinop, Turkey
Living people
Kuleli Military High School alumni
Turkish Military Academy alumni
Turkish Army generals
Leaders of political parties in Turkey
Rights and Equality Party politicians
Turkish nationalists
Turkish political party founders